Parvatipuram Town railway station (station code:PVPT) is an Indian railway station that serves Parvathipuram town in Vizianagaram district.

History 

Between 1893 and 1896,  of the East Coast State Railway was opened for traffic. In 1898–99, Bengal Nagpur Railway was  linked to the lines in southern India.

The  Vizianagaram–Parvatipuram line was opened in 1908–09 and an extension to Salur was built in 1913. The Parvatipuram–Raipur line was completed in 1931.

Railway reorganization 

The Bengal Nagpur Railway was nationalized in 1944.Eastern Railway was formed on 14 April 1952 with the portion of East Indian Railway Company east of Mughalsarai and the Bengal Nagpur Railway. In 1955, South Eastern Railway was carved out of Eastern Railway. It comprised lines mostly operated by BNR earlier. New zones were started in April 2003 and then East Coast Railway and South East Central Railway were carved out from North Eastern Railway.

Development of Parvathipuram railway station 
Due to increase of Parvathipuram Town towards south. Parvathipuram railway station is being developed. From 2011 new express trains were given halt at Parvathipuram railway station excluding Parvathipuram Town railway station.

References 

Railway stations in Vizianagaram district
Waltair railway division